Joseph J. Fredella House and Garage is a historic home and garage located at Glens Falls, Warren County, New York.  They were built in 1912 and are constructed of concrete block.  The house is an American Foursquare style, two-story concrete residence covered by a hipped roof covered in slate.  The garage is a two-story, rectangular flat-roofed structure.

It was added to the National Register of Historic Places in 1984.

The building was demolished and a parking lot put in its place sometime before 2016.

References

Houses on the National Register of Historic Places in New York (state)
Houses completed in 1912
Houses in Warren County, New York
1912 establishments in New York (state)
National Register of Historic Places in Warren County, New York